Charles Emile Etienne Dumont (31 August 1867 – 22 April 1939) was a left-leaning French politician who was Minister of Public Works in 1911 and Minister of Finance in 1913.
The "Dumont Resolution" passed by the Chamber of Deputies in 1917 called for security after World War I (1914–18) to be based on the armed forces of France and her allies, and also for the establishment of a society of nations.
Dumont was again Minister of Finance in 1930, and was Minister of the Navy in 1931–32. 
He initiated construction of the battleship Dunkerque as part of a naval expansion program.
Dumont came from a family of peasant winemakers from the Jura, and did much to promote development of that region as president of the Jura Departmental Council from 1921 to 1939.

Life

Early years

Charles Dumont was born in Ajaccio, Corsica, on 31 August 1867.
His family came from Jura, and had been peasant winemakers in Brainans, near Poligny, for three centuries.
His father worked in the Posts department and had been assigned to a position in Ajaccio.
Charles Dumont was well educated. 
He completed his secondary education at the Lycée Henri-IV, then went to the Sorbonne where he earned a Bachelor of Science and then a degree in Law.
He became involved in politics as a student, and became general secretary of an anti-Boulangist committee.
In 1891 he began to teach secondary school, first at the lycée of Puy, then of Bourges and finally at Lons-le-Saunier.
He wrote two books in this period, one on the Bulgarian issue and one on the fight against anarchist and pacifist propaganda.
He became a Freemason.

Deputy

Dumont was elected deputy for the district of Poligny, Jura, on 22 May 1898 and joined the Radical group. 
He was reelected in April–May 1902 and 6–20 May 1906.
He took a socialist position in favor of the strikes of 1904 and 1909, and in support of workers' pensions.
Article four of the proposed 1905 law for the separation of church and state allowed for creation of associations culturelles, mainly composed of lay Catholics, which would inherit properties such as churches and presbyteries.
In April 1905 Dumont and Maurice Allard, who was also from the Left, objected to article four since they wanted to sever any connections between the Church of Rome and the associations culturelles.
Dumont was interested in fiscal matters throughout his political career.
He was general rapporteur for the 1910 budget.
He was reelected in April–May 1910, and on 2 March 1911 was appointed Minister of Public Works, Posts and Telegraphs in the cabinet of Ernest Monis, holding office until 27 June 1911.

Dumont was made Minister of Finance in the cabinet of Louis Barthou formed on 22 March 1913.
In October–November 1913 Dumont, Barthou, Foreign Affairs minister Stéphen Pichon and General Joseph Joffre were involved in finalizing an agreement with the Russian premier Count Vladimir Kokovtsov for a railway loan. At the last moment the negotiations stalled when Joffre said the protocol must have a supplement that said the railways would be built to the plan agreed by the Chiefs of the General Staffs of France and Russia, which the Tsar had approved at the start of September.
Kokovtsov did not know of this plan, and was unable to agree.
With a looming threat of war, Dumont lost office on 2 December 1913 over a dispute about whether pensions should be immune when a loan to the Treasury was required in the event of an emergency.

Dumont retained his seat in the general elections of April–May 1914.
During World War I (1914–18) he was the delegate of the Budget Committee for verification of war material. 
In this role he undertook numerous missions to the front lines. His influential but confidential reports were not published until after the war.
During a debate in June 1917 over France's post-war goals, Dumont came up with a resolution that reasserted France's claim to Alsace-Lorraine and the requirement for German reparations, then defined a compromise position between those who looked to international organizations for peacekeeping and those who preferred more traditional means.
The resolution said,

The "Dumont Resolution" passed by 467 votes to 52, with 39 socialists voting in favor and 47 against.
Despite the government commitment to the Dumont Resolution, the SFIO (socialist) deputies continued to agitate for establishment of a society of nations. 
Dumont was reelected deputy for Poligny on the Republican Union list in the general elections of 16 November 1919.
In April 1920 he was again general rapporteur of the budget bill.

Provincial politics

Dumont was elected councilor for Jura in 1913.
He was president of the General Council of Jura from 1921 to 1939.
He tried to improve the organization of tourism in the region, and to make it more accessible through a major highway through Poligny and the col de la Faucille.
On 9 March 1914 he was named administrator of the Central Society of provincial banks (Société centrale des banques de province, SCBP), and on 19 March 1914 President of the SCBP, holding this position until 23 March 1922, when he and eight administrators resigned.

Senator

Dumont was elected Senator on 6 January 1924 to replace Stéphen Pichon, who had retired.
He sat with the Democratic Left in the Senate, and twice was general rapporteur of the budget.
He was appointed Minister of Finance in the first cabinet of Camille Chautemps from 21 February to 2 March 1930.
He was Minister of the Navy in three successive cabinets of Pierre Laval from 27 January 1931 to 20 February 1932.
He presided over a naval expansion, and initiated construction of the battleship Dunkerque.
At one time Dumont was president of the Franco-Japanese bank.

Charles Dumont died of a heart attack in Meulan, Seine-et-Oise, on 22 April 1939 at the age of 72.

Publications

Notes

Sources

Further reading

1867 births
1939 deaths
Politicians from Ajaccio
Independent Radical politicians
Democratic Republican Alliance politicians
French Ministers of Public Works, Posts and Telegraphs
French Ministers of Finance
French Naval Ministers
Members of the 7th Chamber of Deputies of the French Third Republic
Members of the 8th Chamber of Deputies of the French Third Republic
Members of the 9th Chamber of Deputies of the French Third Republic
Members of the 10th Chamber of Deputies of the French Third Republic
Members of the 11th Chamber of Deputies of the French Third Republic
Members of the 12th Chamber of Deputies of the French Third Republic
French Senators of the Third Republic
Senators of Jura (department)